Holler is a 2020 American drama film, written and directed by Nicole Riegel, in her directorial debut. It stars Jessica Barden, Becky Ann Baker, Pamela Adlon, Gus Halper and Austin Amelio. Paul Feig serves as an executive producer under his Feigco Entertainment banner.

It had its world premiere at the Deauville American Film Festival on September 8, 2020. It was released on June 11, 2021, by IFC Films.

Plot
A young woman joins a dangerous scrap metal crew in order to pay her way to college. With her goal in sight, she realizes the ultimate cost for education is more than she bargained for, and finds herself torn between a promising future and a family she would be leaving behind.

Cast
 Jessica Barden as Ruth
 Gus Halper as Blaze
 Austin Amelio as Hark, a junkyard owner who sells metal scraps overseas 
 Becky Ann Baker as Linda, a friend of Ruth and Blaze who works at a factory 
 Pamela Adlon as Rhonda, drug addicted mother of Blaze and Ruth
 Myesha Butler as Desiree, Blaze's girlfriend

Release
The film had its world premiere at the Deauville American Film Festival on September 8, 2020. It also screened at the 2020 Toronto International Film Festival as part of TIFF Industry Selects on September 9, 2020. Initially the film was set to world premiere at South by Southwest in March 2020, however, the festival was cancelled due to the COVID-19 pandemic. In February 2021, IFC Films acquired distribution rights to the film. It was released on June 11, 2021.

Critical reception
 The website's critical consensus reads, "It's hard not to hear echoes of similarly desperate stories, but Holler drowns them out with strong performances and palpable empathy."

References

External links
 
 
 

2020 films
2020 directorial debut films
2020 independent films
American drama films
American independent films
IFC Films films
2020 drama films
2020s English-language films
2020s American films